The La Mouette Profil is a French high-wing, single-place hang glider that was designed and produced by La Mouette of Fontaine-lès-Dijon.

Design and development
The Profil was built as an intermediate glider, with a 50% double surface wing and an enclosed crossbar. The Profil was built in two sizes to account for differing pilot weights. The aircraft is made from aluminum tubing, with the wing covered in Dacron sailcloth. All models have a nose angle of 120°.

Variants
Profil 13
Small model for lighter pilot weights.
Profil 15
Large model for heavier pilot weights.

Specifications (Profil 15)

References

External links
Photos of the Profil

Profil
Hang gliders